Southwark (Br  [ˈsʌðɨk]) North was a parliamentary constituency in the Metropolitan Borough of Southwark, in South London.  It returned one Member of Parliament (MP)  to the House of Commons of the Parliament of the United Kingdom.

History
The constituency was created for the 1918 general election, and abolished for the 1950 general election, when it was largely replaced by the new Southwark constituency.

Boundaries

The constituency comprised the Metropolitan Borough of Southwark wards of Christchurch, St. Jude, St. Michael and St. Saviour. It covered almost all of Cathedrals ward and the northern part of the Chaucer ward in the modern day London Borough of Southwark.

Members of Parliament

Election results

Election in the 1910s

Election in the 1920s

Election in the 1930s

After the election, Strauss took the Liberal National whip.

Election in the 1940s

References

Parliamentary constituencies in London (historic)
Constituencies of the Parliament of the United Kingdom established in 1918
Constituencies of the Parliament of the United Kingdom disestablished in 1950
Politics of the London Borough of Southwark